Manuel Eduardo Sarmiento Aponte (born February 2, 1956) is a Venezuelan former professional baseball pitcher who played with the Cincinnati Reds (1976–79), Seattle Mariners (1980) and Pittsburgh Pirates (1982–83) in Major League Baseball.

Sarmiento played for four years with Cincinnati's "Big Red Machine". While with the Reds, he posted a 14–8 record with 138 strikeouts, six saves, and a 4.12 ERA in 132 appearances (including five as a starting pitcher).

In 1980, Sarmiento was injured while with Seattle, requiring season-ending surgery. Sarmiento was traded in early 1981 to the Red Sox, where he played the entire season at their AAA affiliate, Pawtucket. He was purchased by Pittsburgh after the 1981 season. For part of 1982, he switched from the bullpen in an emergency move and had a 9–4 record with 81 strikeouts and 3.39 ERA record before returning to relief duties in the 1983 season.

In a seven-season career, Sarmiento compiled a 26–22 mark with 283 strikeouts and a 3.49 ERA in 513 innings pitched.

Trades and transactions
March 25, 1972 - Signed as a non-drafted free agent by Cincinnati Reds
August 3, 1976 - Recalled by Cincinnati Reds
April 2, 1980 - Released by Cincinnati Reds 
April 14, 1980 - Signed by Seattle Mariners
April 8, 1981 - Traded by Seattle Mariners to Boston Red Sox in exchange for Dick Drago; waived by Boston, assigned to Pawtucket Red Sox (IL)
October 23, 1981 - Sold by Boston Red Sox to Pittsburgh Pirates
April 4, 1982 - Outrighted by Pirates to minor league camp
February 7, 1984 - Signed by Pirates to a two-year contract
April 7, 1985 - Assigned to Hawaii Islanders (PCL) by Pittsburgh
1986 - Signed by the Cordoba Cafeteros (MX) as a free agent.

Quote
"Sarmiento was a fine fielder with a lively split-finger fastball and a singing voice good enough to once sing the National Anthem before a game. As a 20-year-old rookie in 1976, the slender Venezuelan helped the Reds to a World Championship with five relief wins". - Ed Walton, at Baseball Library.

See also
 List of players from Venezuela in Major League Baseball

External links
, or Retrosheet
Venezuelan Winter League

1956 births
Living people
Cafeteros de Córdoba players
Cincinnati Reds players
Gulf Coast Reds players
Hawaii Islanders players
Indianapolis Indians players
Major League Baseball pitchers
Major League Baseball players from Venezuela
Mexican League baseball pitchers
Navegantes del Magallanes players
Pawtucket Red Sox players
People from Aragua
Pittsburgh Pirates players
Portland Beavers players
Seattle Mariners players
Seattle Rainiers players
Spokane Indians players
Tampa Tarpons (1957–1987) players
Tigres de Aragua players
Trois-Rivières Aigles players
Venezuelan expatriate baseball players in Canada
Venezuelan expatriate baseball players in Mexico
Venezuelan expatriate baseball players in the United States
Venezuelan expatriate baseball players in Italy
Fortitudo Baseball Bologna players